The Shape Shifters are an underground hip hop collective based in Los Angeles, California. It consists of Akuma, Awol One, Circus, Die Young, Existereo, LA Jae, Life Rexall, Perk One, and Radioinactive.

The group prevented the Shapeshifters, another act from the United Kingdom, from using the name in the United States. That resulted in the latter changing its name to Shape:UK, but for the United States only.

Discography

Albums
 Planet of the Shapes (1998)
 Know Future (1999)
 Adopted by Aliens (2000)
 Soul-Lows (2002)
 Soulows Two (2004)
 The Shape Shifters Was Here (2004)

Singles
 "Triple Threat" (1998)
 "2012" (1999)
 "Circuit City" (2004)

References

External links
 Shape Shifters on Myspace

American hip hop groups
Musical groups from Los Angeles